Barujibi is a Bengali Hindu agrarian caste in India. Their traditional occupation is cultivation of Betel. They are one of the fourteen castes belonging to 'Nabasakh' group.
Barujibis are listed as Other Backward Class (Category-B) in West Bengal.

References 

Bengali Hindu castes
Social groups of West Bengal